Wayne Allan Downing (May 10, 1940 – July 18, 2007) was a four-star United States Army general born in Peoria, Illinois. He graduated from the United States Military Academy with a Bachelor of Science degree in 1962 and held a Master of Business Administration degree from Tulane University. He also served on the board of directors at a private military company, Science Applications International Corporation (SAIC).

Military career
Sep 62 – Feb 63 Student, Infantry Officer Basic and Ranger Course
Apr 63 – Jun 64 Platoon Leader, 173rd Airborne Brigade (Separate)
Jun 64 – Sep 64 Liaison Officer, 173rd Airborne Brigade (Separate)
Dec 64 – Oct 65 Aide-de-Camp to the Commanding General, 173rd Airborne Brigade, Vietnam
Oct 65 – Apr 66 S-2/S-5 (Intel/Civil Affairs) Officer, 173rd Airborne Brigade, Vietnam
Apr 66 – Aug 67 Instructor, Infantry School, Fort Benning, GA
Aug 67 – Jan 68 Company Commander, Infantry Training Center, Fort Benning, GA
Jan 68 – Sep 68 Student, Infantry Officer Advance Course, Infantry School, Fort Benning, GA
Sep 68 – Dec 68 Company Commander, 25th Infantry Division, Vietnam
Dec 68 – Sep 69 Battalion S-3 (Operations) Officer, 25th Infantry Division, Vietnam
Sep 69 – Oct 69 Brigade S-3 (Operations) Officer, 25th Infantry Division, Vietnam
Dec 69 – Jan 72 Graduate Student, Tulane University, New Orleans, LA
Feb 72 – Jun 72 Student, Armed Forces Staff College, Norfolk, VA
Jun 72 – Feb 75 Senior Operations / Systems Analyst, Office of the Secretary of Defense, Washington, D.C.
Mar 75 – Dec 76 Battalion S-3 Officer / Executive Officer, 75th Infantry (Ranger), Fort Stewart, GA
Dec 76 – Mar 77 Commander, Task Force (Alaska), 24th Infantry Division, Fort Stewart, GA
May 77 – Jul 79 Commander, 2nd Battalion (Ranger), 75th Infantry, Fort Lewis, WA
Aug 79 – May 80 Student, Air War College, Maxwell Air Force Base, AL
Jun 80 – Apr 82 Secretary to Joint Staff, European Command, Vaihingen, Germany
May 82 – Apr 84 Commander, 3rd Brigade, 1st Armored Division, U.S. Army Europe, Germany
May 84 – Nov 85 Commander, 75th Infantry Regiment (Ranger) which was converted to 75th Ranger Regiment, Fort Benning, GA
Nov 85 – Jun 87 Deputy Commanding General, 1st Special Operations Command, Fort Bragg, NC
Jun 87 – May 88 Director, Washington Office, United States Special Operations Command, MacDill Air Force Base, FL
May 88 – Dec 89 Deputy Chief of Staff (Training), U.S. Army Training and Doctrine Command, Fort Monroe, VA
Dec 89 – Aug 91 Commanding General, Joint Special Operations Command, U.S. Special Operations Command, Fort Bragg, NC
Aug 91 – Apr 93 Commanding General, U.S. Army Special Operations Command, Fort Bragg, NC
May 93 – Feb 96 Commander-in-Chief, U.S. Special Operations Command (SOCOM), MacDill Air Force Base, FL

Post 9/11
In 2001, Downing came out of retirement to coordinate the national campaign "to detect, disrupt and destroy global terrorist organizations and those who support them."  He held the title of National Director and Deputy National Security Advisor for combating terrorism.  He reported to then-National Security Advisor Condoleezza Rice and Homeland Security director Tom Ridge. From 2003 until his death he held the Distinguished Chair at the Combating Terrorism Center at West Point.

Downing was formerly a director of Metal Storm and a senior executive with Science Applications International Corporation (SAIC).  He also performed various speaking engagements.

Besides working for the US government in his retiree years, he also worked for NBC News as a military analyst.

In 2006, he received the United States Military Academy's 2006 Distinguished Graduate Award.

Downing died on July 18, 2007, of meningitis and was buried in the West Point Cemetery, West Point, New York on September 27, 2007.  His grave is just north of the main cemetery building.

On September 24, 2008, the Metropolitan Authority of Peoria voted unanimously to change the name of the Greater Peoria Regional Airport to the "General Wayne A. Downing Peoria International Airport".

Awards and decorations
Downing's awards and decorations include: 
 

Downing also earned the Vietnam Civil Actions Medal Unit Citation, French Parachutist Badge, 75th Ranger Regiment DUI and Secretary of Defense ID Badge. In 1971, he was reported to have also received the Distinguished Flying Cross with one oak leaf cluster for his service in Vietnam. Downing wore these decorations as a major general in 1988 but omitted them as a general.

Civilian career
Downing was on the Board of Directors of SAIC and Chairman of the Special Projects Committee of the Corporation.

References

External links
 Commemoration for Wayne Downing by NBC News
 An interview with General Wayne Downing on WTVP's "Interesting People" Recorded on March 31, 2006
 Profile at SourceWatch

1940 births
2007 deaths
Deaths from meningitis
United States Military Academy alumni
Tulane University alumni
United States Army generals
People from Peoria, Illinois
United States Army personnel of the Vietnam War
Joint Forces Staff College alumni
Air War College alumni
Recipients of the Distinguished Service Medal (US Army)
Recipients of the Silver Star
Recipients of the Legion of Merit
Recipients of the Distinguished Flying Cross (United States)
Recipients of the Gallantry Cross (Vietnam)
Recipients of the Legion of Honour
American broadcast news analysts
Recipients of the Soldier's Medal
Burials at West Point Cemetery
Colonels of the 75th Ranger Regiment
Recipients of the Air Medal
Recipients of the Defense Superior Service Medal
Recipients of the Defense Distinguished Service Medal
Presidential Citizens Medal recipients
Neurological disease deaths in Illinois
Infectious disease deaths in Illinois
Journalists from Illinois
Military personnel from Illinois
United States Deputy National Security Advisors
United States Army personnel of the Gulf War
20th-century American journalists
American male journalists